Jelvan (also Romanized as Jelvān) is a village in Qahab-e Shomali Rural District, in the Central District of Isfahan County, Isfahan Province, Iran. At the 2006 census, its population was 1,083, in 286 families.

References 

Populated places in Isfahan County